Go Fish is a simple card game.

Go Fish may also refer to:

In film and television:
 Go Fish (film), a 1994 American lesbian-themed film
 Go Fish (TV series), a 2001 American sitcom starring Kieran Culkin
 "Go Fish" (Buffy the Vampire Slayer), an episode of Buffy the Vampire Slayer
 "Go Fish" (The Penguins of Madagascar), an episode of The Penguins of Madagascar
 Go Fish Pictures, a specialty film distribution subsidiary of DreamWorks
 Go Fish, a 2019 animated film

In other media:
 Go Fish, a comic strip by J. C. Duffy

See also 
 "Go Fishing", a song by Roger Waters from The Pros and Cons of Hitch Hiking